Scoparia metaleucalis is a moth in the family Crambidae. It was described by George Hampson in 1907. It is found in Sichuan, China.

The length of the forewings is 7–8 mm. The forewings have blackish-brown scales. The antemedian line is white and the antemedian stigmata are blackish brown. The postmedian and subterminal lines are white. The hindwings are white.

References

Moths described in 1907
Scorparia